Shara is a village in the Leh district of Ladakh, India. It is located in the Kharu tehsil.

Demographics 
According to the 2011 census of India, Shara has 57 households. The effective literacy rate (i.e. the literacy rate of population excluding children aged 6 and below) is 75.38%.

References 

Villages in Kharu tehsil